In topography, a nadir is a point on a surface that is lower in elevation than all points immediately adjacent to it. Mathematically, a nadir is a local minimum of elevation. A nadir may be the lowest point of a dry basin or depression, or the deepest point of a body of water or ice. The nadir of a body of water is often called a "deep", as in the Challenger Deep, the nadir of the Earth's oceans.

See also
Depression (geology)
Endorheic basin
Geoid
List of places on land with elevations below sea level
Maxima and minima
Summit (topography) (antonym)
Topography

Cartography
Geodesy
Physical geography
Surveying
Topography